Elaine O'Neal (born 1962) is an American attorney, academic administrator, judge, and politician serving as the mayor of Durham, North Carolina. O'Neal is the city's first female African-American mayor. Prior to serving as mayor, O'Neal was the first woman appointed as chief district court judge in Durham County and the first woman North Carolina Superior Court judge in Durham County. She served as an interim dean of the North Carolina Central University School of Law in 2018.

Early life and education 
O'Neal was born in Durham in 1962 and grew up in the West End community, spending much of her childhood at the Pauli Murray Family Home. She is the youngest of five children. Her parents were active in the local community; her mother, Nakoda, worked in electoral precincts and served as a school Parent–teacher association president and her father, Rueben, was a custodian and the treasurer of their church. As a child, O'Neal played the tambourine at her church.

She was educated in Durham Public Schools and graduated from Hillside High School, where she was co-captain of the color guard, in 1980. O'Neal attended North Carolina Central University, where she became a member of Delta Sigma Theta sorority and graduated Cum Laude with a Bachelor of Science in mathematics in 1984. She received her Juris Doctor degree from the North Carolina Central University School of Law.

Career 
O'Neal served as a judge of the North Carolina District Court from 1994 to 2011 and was the first woman in Durham County to be named a Chief District Court judge. As a judge, she advocated for same-sex adoption and LGBT rights. She served as a judge of the North Carolina Superior Court from 2011 to 2018 as the first woman Superior Court Judge in Durham County. In 2015, O'Neal was appointed as the Chairwoman of the Superintendent's Code of Student Conduct Task Force for Durham Public Schools, focusing on ending the school-to-prison pipeline. In June 2018, O'Neal retired as a judge and was selected as interim dean of the North Carolina Central University School of Law. That same year, O'Neal was appointed as Chair of the Racial Equity Task Force for Durham by Mayor Steve Schewel.

O'Neal was elected as the first African-American woman Mayor of Durham in 2021, succeeding Steve Schewel. She received two-thirds of the vote in a seven-way nonpartisan primary election on October 5, 2021. O'Neal received 25,707 votes or 84.69% of the vote. City councilwoman Javiera Caballero, also a Democrat running for mayor, suspended her campaign on October 11, 2021 and ceded the election to O'Neal. After being elected into office, O'Neal stated that her first order of business was reducing gun violence. Durham North Carolina has a weak mayor system. O'Neal has limited mayoral powers, and formally her role is not substantially different from members of the city council.

O'Neal is a member of the Durham County Bar Association and the George H. White Bar Association.

Mayoral campaign 
O’Neal announced her mayoral campaign on July 26, 2021. In her announcement, O’Neal called back to her deep Durham roots and highlighted her years in public service. She mourned the young lives lost to violent crime in Durham and ensured that she will improve the conditions of her home city. To close her speech, O’Neal envisioned a “Durham for everyone. United and not divided.” 

O’Neal was active on several social media platforms throughout her campaign. She primarily used Twitter and Facebook to spread the word about her campaign for mayor, announce her endorsements, and hire volunteers for her campaign.

Programs and policies 
On April 18th, 2022, 3 months after O'Neal was elected as mayor, she released her first State of the City address. She said that her three biggest concerns for Durham were reducing crime, developing small businesses, and enhancing transportation. Gun violence is a major issue in Durham and was one of the first major issues O’Neal discussed. She stated: "Our city is in crisis, and gun violence has taken the lives of far too many of our relatives and our young Black men." In her plan, she also addressed wanting to establish equity in certain areas due to past urban renewal policies that have caused those areas to suffer. O'Neal said that the city is investing resources back into those areas in order to increase economic prosperity and allocating city funds to low-cost loans for local business to increase economic prosperity.  

To tackle crime in the city she is working with current and past city leaders to create a program that will work with Durham's youth and young adults. The program would offer mentoring, therapy, and after-school programs. One of the aims of this program would be to expunge the records of previous offenders using a program called “the new sustainable justice movement program” under the Hayti Reborn organization. The hope of this program is to engage those closest to the pain to help turn the city around. O’Neal faced scrutiny because of the interactions she had with former gang members. She explained the desire to get their perspective on how to reduce gun violence within the city and have them be a part of the solution. In an effort to address the scrutiny, O'Neal stated: "it pains me to think that we should not talk or interact with these young men, to get their perspective on Durham and have them be a part of the solution." Eight former gang members were introduced to the public by O’Neal. One of the men introduced was Dennis Garrett, who orchestrated a ceasefire among gang members to help reduce gun violence. 

O'Neal announced the city’s contribution to assist small businesses and especially the rebuilding of black-owned companies. O’Neal has said any small business can apply to the Durham Small Business Opportunity Loan Fund regardless of the need for financial assistance. The program has distributed $800,000 in loans to 38 small business owners since the summer of 2020, contributions were made from the city and county funds and Duke University. 

A mock $19.8 million check from the U.S. Department of Transportation (USDOT) was presented to O’Neal and Transportation Director Sean Egan. This money was to be used for the 1.8- mile Rail Trail and the main Durham Station improvements and upgrades. 

The City of Durham has also created a new Down Payment Assistance program. Those who are low-income and due to rising prices in the city are struggling to buy homes, they are the main focus of the program. Up to $20,000 in down payments and closing cost is available for qualifying applicants.

Personal life 
O'Neal is a practicing Baptist and attends First Calvary Baptist Church in Durham. She is a board member of the non-profit organization Made in Durham.

References 

Living people
1962 births
21st-century American judges
21st-century American women lawyers
21st-century American lawyers
African-American mayors in North Carolina
African-American judges
African-American women lawyers
African-American lawyers
Baptists from North Carolina
Politicians from Durham, North Carolina
Mayors of Durham, North Carolina
North Carolina Democrats
North Carolina Central University alumni
North Carolina Central University faculty
North Carolina state court judges
Superior court judges in the United States
Date of birth missing (living people)
African-American women mayors
21st-century American women judges